Ljudmila Pavlov (born 30 June 1974) is a Serbian former professional tennis player.

Yugoslavia
Active during the 1990s, Pavlov is a native of Novi Sad and developed an interest in tennis as there was a club near the radio station her parents worked at. She was a contemporary of Monica Seles, who is the same age and also grew up with her in Novi Sad. It was an injury to Seles that gave Pavlov a Federation Cup debut for Yugoslavia in 1991.

College tennis
Pavlov played collegiate tennis for Northwestern State University in Louisiana. In 1994 she became the first player from Northwestern State to earn a national collegiate singles ranking and she was named Southland Conference player of the year. Plagued by shoulder problems for much of the remainder of her collegiate career, she graduated from Northwestern State with honours in 1997.

References

External links
 
 
 

1974 births
Living people
Yugoslav female tennis players
Serbian female tennis players
Northwestern State Demons and Lady Demons athletes
College women's tennis players in the United States
Sportspeople from Novi Sad
Northwestern State University alumni